The first Bible translations into Hungarian date from the 15-16th centuries, as do the first Hussite Bible and the Vizsoly Bible.

Translations
Hussite Bible is the first Hungarian translation of the Bible, dates back to 1416. It was translated by Tamás Pécsi and Bálint Újlaki, two Hussite Hungarian priests, who studied in Prague between 1399 and 1411.
 Újszövetség (New Testament) is the first remained full New Testament in Hungarian translated by János Sylvester in 1541. It was also the first book printed in Hungary, at the domain of the Tamás Nádasdy in Sárvár.
 Vizsoly Bible is the first remained complete version in Hungarian, translated by Gáspár Károli Calvinist pastor in 1590. times It is named after the village of Vizsoly and was printed in 700-800 copy originally, gained wide popularity and occasionally used even today as the "classic" translation (similarly to the KJV in English).  It was revised several times, the 1908 edition being widely adopted. 
 Káldi Bible was the first full Catholic version in Hungarian, translated by György Káldy in 1626 and printed in Vienna. It was revised several times, most recently in 1997.
Szent István Társulati Biblia (Saint Stephen Society Bible): Catholic  (1973)
Bible of the Magyar Bibliatársulat (Hungarian Bible Society): Protestant (1975)
Bible of the Szent Jeromos Bibliatársulat: (Saint Jerome Bible Society): Catholic and based on Káldi's translation and the Nova Vulgata (1997)
Hungarian version of the New World Translation: Jehovah's Witnesses (2003)

Comparison

External links
 Hungarian Bible translations online (Protestant and Catholic)
 Káldi Bible online
 Vizsoly Bible online
 János Sylvester's Újszövetség online (PDF)
Several Bible translations from the Old and Middle Hungarian period are available in the Old Hungarian Corpus.

References

Hungarian
Hungarian literature
History of Christianity in Hungary